The 2015–16 Stuttgarter Kickers season is the 116th season in the club's football history. In 2015–16 the club plays in the 3. Liga, the third tier of German football. The club also takes part in the DFB-Pokal and in the 2015–16 edition of the Württemberg Cup.

Transfers & contracts

In

Out

Contracts

Matches

Legend

Friendly matches

1.Times in Central European Time/Central European Summer Time
2.Kickers goals listed first.

3. Liga

League fixtures and results

Table

League table

Summary table

DFB-Pokal

Württemberg Cup

Team statistics

Squad information

Squad and statistics

Top scorers

Penalties

All competitions

3. Liga

Württemberg Cup

|-
|()* = Penalties saved
|-

Clean sheets

Multi–goal matches

Overview of statistics

Discipline

Cards

Suspensions

Team kit

Reserve team
Kickers' reserve team plays in the Oberliga Baden-Württemberg and the coach is Alfred Kaminski.

Technical staff

Notes
5.Klaus, Leutenecker, Starostzik, Gaiser, Baumgärtel, Bahn, Marchese, Braun, Mendler, Badiane, G. Müller, Fischer, Berko, Ivan
6.Pachonik, Starostzik, Baumgärtel, Abruscia, Braun, Stein, Bahn, Berko, Mendler, Badiane
8.Klaus, Leutenecker, Starostzik, Gaiser, Baumgärtel, Bahn, Marchese, Braun, Mendler, G. Müller, Berko

Sources

Match reports

Other sources

External links
 2015-16 Stuttgarter Kickers season at Kickersarchiv.de 
 2015–16 Stuttgarter Kickers season at Weltfussball.de 
 2015–16 Stuttgarter Kickers season at Fussballdaten.de 

Stuttgarter Kickers
Stuttgarter Kickers seasons